Skunk Creek is a tributary of the Big Sioux River, located in the southeastern South Dakota counties of Minnehaha and Lake.  It has a confluence with the Big Sioux in the west central area of Sioux Falls.

Skunk Creek was a natural habitat of skunks, hence the name.

See also
List of rivers of South Dakota

References

Rivers of South Dakota
Rivers of Lake County, South Dakota
Rivers of Minnehaha County, South Dakota
Rivers of Moody County, South Dakota